The 2008 FA Vase Final was the 34th final of the Football Association Challenge Vase, usually referred to as the FA Vase. The final took place on 14 May 2008 at Wembley Stadium in London in front of 19,537 spectators. The clubs contesting the final were North West Counties League Division Two club Kirkham & Wesham, and Eastern Counties Football League club Lowestoft Town. Both teams were playing in their first FA Vase final.

Kirkham & Wesham entered the competition from the beginning in the first qualifying round while Lowestoft Town received a bye to the second round proper. Kirkham & Wesham proceeded through the two qualifying rounds and five proper rounds without needing a replay. They did need a replay in the quarter-finals after a 3–3 draw at home to Coventry Sphinx, they won the replay 1–0 and went on to eliminate Needham Market in the two-legged semi-final 4–2 on aggregate. Lowestoft Town proceeded through all five of their single-legged ties without needing a replay. In the semi-final they eliminated Whitley Bay 4–3 on aggregate.

Lowestoft Town went ahead in the 10th minute when Kirkham defender Phil Thompson scored a headed own goal. Kirkham manager, Mike Fuller, subbed on Matt Walwyn in the 79th minute who equalised five minutes later. Walwyn then scored three minutes into stoppage time to give Kirkham & Wesham their first FA Vase in the club's first participation in the competition.

Match

Details

References

External links
 

FA Vase Finals
FA Vase Final
FA Vase Final
Events at Wembley Stadium
FA Vase Final 2008
FA Vase Final 2008
FA Vase Final